La desconocida is a Mexican telenovela produced by Televisa for Telesistema Mexicano in 1963.

Cast 
María Rivas
Guillermo Zetina
Aldo Monti
Josefina Escobedo
Raúl Meraz
Nicolás Rodríguez
Martha Zamora
Pituka de Foronda
Carlos Ancira
Enrique Becker

See also 
List of telenovelas of Televisa

References

External links 

Mexican telenovelas
1963 telenovelas
Televisa telenovelas
1963 Mexican television series debuts
1963 Mexican television series endings
Spanish-language telenovelas